The Geneva International Film Festival (GIFF)  is an annual film festival founded in 1995. The festival, previously called the Geneva International Film Festival Tous Ecrans, was renamed in July 2017 as the Geneva International Film Festival (GIFF). Every year for over ten days, it offers a series of experiences focused on image, sound, and new forms of narration, which include screenings, interactive installations, VR works, conferences, and live performances.

The festival also co-hosts the ‘Beyond Cinema: Swiss Digital Showcase’ event at the Cannes Film Festival as well as the Swiss Party at Austin's South by Southwest festival and it is one of the first in the world to host an International VR Films Competition, as well as an out-of-competition section for digital works called Virtual Territories.

Emmanuel Cuénod has been the Executive and Artistic Director of the Festival since 2013.

The festival includes six competitions, events, and convergent sections (Nuits Blanches, Retrospective, Serial Days & Nights, Film & Beyond Award).

Programme

Film 

Competitions

 International Features Competition 
 International Short Competition

Out of Competitions

 Highlight Screenings : major filmmakers, cult feature films and the year's most awaited films.
 Rien que pour vos yeux : a section born out of desire to share our favorite funds.

Television 

Competitions

 International TV Series Competition
 International Music Videos Competition

Out of Competitions

 International TV Series Out of Competition
 Cinéastes, de notre temps : between 2013 and 2015, the Festival presented the complete collection of the "Cinéaste de notre temps" documentary. Since then, every year, the "Cinéastes, de notre temps: les inédits" (Filmmakers of our times: Original Cuts’) section has been added to the Festival's programme in order to bring to the audience the latest chapters of this series produced and directed by Janine Bazin and André S. Labarthe since 1964.

Digital 

Competitions

 International VR Works Competition
 International Web Series Competition

Out of Competitions

 Virtual Territories : an out-of-competition section for digital works.

Event and converging sections 

 48H Film Project : the Festival hosts the Swiss section of this international competition.
 Serial Days & Nights : a whole weekend dedicated to TV and web series, featuring some 20 pilot projects.
 Nuits blanches : a series of selected works that link with a musical event scheduled for the evening of the screening.
 Film & Beyond Award : this award is given to a cross-disciplinary artist, the Festival's guest of honour, for their entire body of work. The award is also an opportunity to screen the guest artist's work during the event.
 Children's Day : On Sunday, a series of workshops and film screenings for young ones.
 The Retrospective : this section highlights the work of an author, director, film genre, audiovisual production or technique.

Awards

Film 

 Reflet d’Or for Best International Feature Film donated by the City and the State of Geneva : CHF 10’000
 Reflet d’Or for Best International Short : CHF 1’500
 RTS Award for Best International Short : purchase

Television 
 Reflet d’Or for Best International TV Series donated by the City and the State of Geneva : CHF 10’000
 Reflet d’Or for Best Music Video : CHF 1’500

Digital 
 Reflet d’Or for Best International VR Work donated by the City and the State of Geneva : CHF 10’000
 Reflet d’Or for Best Web Series : CHF 1’500
 Youth Jury Award for Best VR Work : honorary

Honorific prize 
 Film & Beyond Award
 2016 : Apichatpong Weerasethakul
 2015 : Anton Corbijn
 2014 : Jean-Hugues Anglade

References

External links
Official Site
IMDB
Awards in 2016
Awards in 2015
Awards in 2014
Awards in 2013
Awards in 2012
Awards in 2011
Awards in 2010

Film festivals in Switzerland